Anna Szymańska (born 5 December 1988) is a Polish footballer who plays as a goalkeeper and has appeared for the Poland women's national team.

Career
Szymańska has been capped for the Poland national team, appearing for the team during the 2019 FIFA Women's World Cup qualifying cycle.

References

External links
 
 
 

1988 births
Living people
Polish women's footballers
Poland women's international footballers
Women's association football goalkeepers
KKS Czarni Sosnowiec players